Carposina smaragdias is a moth in the Carposinidae family. It was described by Turner in 1916. It is found in Australia, where it has been recorded from Queensland.

The wingspan is about 31 mm.

References

Natural History Museum Lepidoptera generic names catalog

Carposinidae
Moths described in 1916
Moths of Australia